Daddy's Little Girls is a 2007 American film written and directed by Tyler Perry and produced by Perry and Reuben Cannon. The film stars Idris Elba, Gabrielle Union, Louis Gossett Jr., and Tracee Ellis Ross. It tells the story of a lawyer who helps a mechanic in a custody battle against his mean-spirited ex-wife over who will get custody of their daughters.

Daddy's Little Girls was released on February 14, 2007 by Lions Gate Entertainment. This is the first of six films directed by Perry that he does not appear in (the other five being Acrimony, For Colored Girls, Temptation: Confessions of a Marriage Counselor, Nobody's Fool and A Jazzman's Blues) as well as the first of Perry's films to not be based on any of the filmmaker's stage plays.

Plot

 
In Edgewood, Atlanta, Monty James (Idris Elba) is a mechanic working for Willie (Louis Gossett Jr.) who dreams of owning his own shop. His three daughters, Sierra (Sierra McClain), Lauryn (Lauryn McClain), and China (China Anne McClain) have been cared for by their elderly maternal grandmother Kat (Juanita Jennings) with frequent visits from Monty along with financial support. Before her death from lung cancer, Kat asks Monty to take custody of them since her daughter/Monty's ex-wife Jennifer (Tasha Smith) has little to no interest in her daughters, having not visited them in several months prior to her mother’s death. She is preferably more involved in the business activity of her live-in boyfriend Joe (Gary Anthony Sturgis), the main drug dealer in the neighborhood who people are afraid of testifying against or else he'll have them killed.

Following Kat's funeral, Jennifer arrives with Joe and his thugs upset that no one notified her of her mother’s death. Jennifer tries to physically take the girls from Monty demanding that they leave with her and Joe, but her aunt Rita (Cassi Davis) steps in and stops her. She leaves, but informs Monty that she intends to seek full custody of the girls.

In an effort to earn extra money, Monty accepts a job as a driver for Julia Rossmore (Gabrielle Union), an attorney, at the recommendation of his next-door neighbor Maya (Malinda Williams) who works as her assistant. When Monty and Julia meet, she insists they refrain from fraternizing and keeps a strict schedule. Monty has to work later than expected one night after Julia’s friends, Brenda (Terri J. Vaughn) and Cynthia (Tracee Ellis Ross), set Julia up on a blind date with Byron (Craig Robinson) who turns out to be an unemployed and obnoxious aspiring rapper. While driving Julia home, Monty receives a call that his children were involved in a house fire. Without explanation to Julia, Monty immediately heads to the hospital against the protest of an uninformed Julia who fires him.

When Monty arrives at the hospital, it is revealed that Sierra accidentally started a fire and that the girls were home alone with no adult supervision until Maya rescued them. Julia follows Monty into the hospital to demand she be driven home in time to hear the Social Services representative Laurie Bell (Donna Biscoe) who was notified by the hospital, make the decision based on the circumstances, to grant immediate temporary custody to their mother, setting a date for a custody hearing. Monty drives Julia home and they part ways. Julia hires a replacement driver and Monty returns to work as a mechanic. Meanwhile, the girls face constant abuse and neglect from Joe and Jennifer.

Monty is called to Sierra's school after she is caught with drugs according to the principal (Bennet Guillory). Sierra explains to Monty that Joe and Jennifer are forcing her to sell drugs under the threat of hurting Monty if she refused. Jennifer and Joe arrive and are enraged that the school contacted Monty. Joe threatens Monty during a brief altercation in the principal's office. Aware that Joe can afford a high-power attorney for the custody hearing, Monty goes to Julia for help. Julia knows that he cannot afford to hire the firm and turns him away, interpreting his actions as an attempt to use her to get custody so he can use the girls to get government assistance. Feeling insulted, Monty leaves after telling Julia to get a life and a man.

Julia goes on another blind date with the attorney Christopher (Brian J. White) who she thinks is perfect for her until his wife and kids expose him. On the day of Monty’s custody hearing, Julia is leaving a different courtroom and overhears Monty’s failing attempt to represent himself. After listening to Monty try to inform the judge that the girls are living with a drug dealer, she steps in as his attorney and is able to get the hearing delayed. Julia agrees to represent him provided that case preparation occurs after office hours. Later, while preparing for the hearing, Julia asks Monty if there is anything bad she should know about him so that she is not surprised in court. They are interrupted by a phone call and the question goes unanswered.

Upon discovering it's her birthday and that Julia has no plans, Monty takes her to the jazz club in his neighborhood where they drink with his friends and dance. Julia kisses Monty and asks him to spend the night. Monty obliges, but a drunken Julia vomiting in the bathroom changes her mind and tells him to go home.

Over the next few weeks, they begin to have strong romantic feelings for each other. Monty invites her to meet his daughters at his apartment during his visitation. She continues to spend time with Monty and his girls and they take a trip to the aquarium. Julia runs into Brenda, who met Monty previously when he was Julia’s driver and figures out that they are now a couple. Brenda pulls Julia to the side and berates Monty, stating that he is beneath her status. Monty overhears Julia’s friend and is hurt. Julia later opens up to Monty and tearfully tells him about her last relationship that ended in betrayal. Monty promises that he won’t betray her and they continue dating.

Monty goes to work and finds Willie has been injured in a robbery. Willie is ready to retire and offers to sell the shop to Monty for a $10,000 deposit that can be paid on a payment schedule. Monty accepts his offer.

At the child custody hearing, Julia argues that it would be in the children's best interest for Monty to be awarded custody and provided the court with a written statement from Jennifer’s deceased mother stating the same. Jennifer's lawyer (Mark Oliver) fights back and claims that Monty is not suitable to raise the girls due to a conviction of statutory rape that occurred 16 years prior. Julia is disgusted and feels betrayed as Monty never told her this information. She refuses to provide him further assistance with his case and leaves. Julia is later comforted by her friends.

At 3:00 am, Monty's daughters arrive at his house and inform him that Joe has been hitting them, proving it by revealing that China's back is bruised while Jennifer just watched and did nothing about it when China was crying. While his daughters are asleep, a livid Monty flashes back to his arrest. Then he drives away and crashes into Jennifer and Joe's car after which he mercilessly beats Joe. The rest of the neighborhood gathers to watch, as Joe's thugs arrive and begin to attack Monty. Having had enough of Joe's terrorism, the neighbors attack Joe's thugs as Monty continues attacking Joe. Julia sees a news report about the police having stopped a near-riot while learning Monty was wrongfully convicted of the supposed rape charges when he was among those arrested. Upon hearing this, Julia rushes to help Monty.

Jennifer and Joe face drug charges in court as the district attorney (Leland L. Jones) stated that drugs were found in Joe's car and house. All of the neighbors decide to testify against Jennifer, Joe, and his thugs as the judge (Giulia Pagano) has them taken into custody with no bond. Monty is then charged with domestic battery toward Joe. Julia walks in to represent Monty, apologizing for not hearing his side of the story. The witnesses refuse to testify against Monty, so the judge dismisses the case. Monty tells Julia that he loves her.

Monty's daughters greet him and Julia at the auto shop that now bears his name, as the rest of the neighborhood celebrates that Monty now owns the auto shop with full custody of his daughters, along with Jennifer, Joe, and his thugs finally being locked away.

Cast

Reception

Box office
The film opened at #5 on Valentine's Day 2007 behind Ghost Rider, Bridge to Terabithia, Norbits second weekend, and Music and Lyrics, and has grossed $31,609,243 worldwide, making it Tyler Perry's lowest-grossing film.

Critical reaction
On Rotten Tomatoes the film holds an approval rating of 26% based on 54 reviews, with an average rating of 4.9/10. The site's critical consensus reads: "Daddy's Little Girls boasts fine performances and a poignant message, but is ultimately let down by amateurish filmmaking." Metacritic assigned the film a weighted average score of 49 out of 100, based on 17 critics, indicating "mixed or average reviews". Audiences polled by CinemaScore gave the film an average grade of "A−" on an A+ to F scale.

Soundtrack
Atlantic Records released Music inspired by the film: Tyler Perry's Daddy's Little Girls, in stores and online on January 16, 2007.  Among the highlights of the album is "Family First," the first-ever recording by the Houston Family -- Whitney Houston, Dionne Warwick, and Cissy Houston. The song "Can't Let You Go" by Anthony Hamilton is not on the soundtrack. Also, the song "Beautiful" by Meshell Ndegeocello is featured in the movie.

 Anthony Hamilton featuring Jaheim and Musiq Soulchild - "Struggle No More (The Main Event)"
 R. Kelly - "Don't Let Go"
 Tamika Scott of "Xscape" - "Greatest Gift"
 Adrian Hood - "Brown Eyed Blues"
 Whitney Houston, Cissy Houston, Dionne Warwick and The Family - "Family First"
 Yolanda Adams - "Step Aside"
 Brian McKnight - "I Believe"
 Beyoncé - "Daddy"
 Anthony Hamilton - "Struggle No More"
 Governor - "Blood, Sweat & Tears"
 Charles "Gator" Moore - "A Change Is Gonna Come"
Wallmart exclusive
12. 3McClainGirls - "Daddy's Girl"

References

External links
 
 
 
 

2007 films
2007 romantic drama films
Films directed by Tyler Perry
African-American romantic drama films
African-American films
Films set in Georgia (U.S. state)
Films shot in Georgia (U.S. state)
American independent films
Lionsgate films
Films with screenplays by Tyler Perry
2007 independent films
2000s English-language films
2000s American films